Plestiodon popei, Pope's skink, is a species of lizard which is endemic to China.

References

popei
Reptiles of China
Reptiles described in 1989
Taxa named by Tsutomu Hikida